Macrocypraea cervus, common name the Atlantic deer cowry, is a species of large sea snail, a very large cowry, a marine gastropod mollusk in the family Cypraeidae, the cowries.

Distribution
This species is mainly distributed in the tropical Atlantic Ocean including the Caribbean Sea, and in the waters off South Carolina, Florida, Mexico, Brazil, Cuba and the Bermudas.

Description
 This species is one of the largest cowries. It is quite similar in shape and colour to Macrocypraea cervinetta, but it is much larger.

The shell is elongated, its basic colour is light brown, with small whitish ocellated spots on the dorsum,  like a young fawn (hence the Latin name cervus, meaning 'deer'). Juveniles have no spots. The dorsum also shows a few transverse clearer bands, and a longitudinal line where the two edges of the mantle meet. The apertural teeth are dark brown. The mantle of the living cowry is dark greyish and completely covered in short fringes.

Habitat
Living cowries can mainly be encountered under corals and rocks in shallow waters at a maximum depth of 35 m. They feed on algae.

References

 Welch J. J. (2010) - "The “Island Rule” and Deep-Sea Gastropods: Re-Examining the Evidence" -  Simon Joly, McGill University, Canada

External links
WoRMS

Cypraeidae
Molluscs described in 1771
Taxa named by Carl Linnaeus